Caroline Wozniacki was the defending champion, but lost to Kaia Kanepi in the third round.

Agnieszka Radwańska won the title, defeating Vera Zvonareva 6–3, 6–2 in the final.

Seeds
The top eight seeds received a bye into the second round.

Qualifying

Main draw

Finals

Top half

Section 1

Section 2

Bottom half

Section 3

Section 4

References
 Main Draw

2011 Singles
Toray Pan Pacific Open - Singles
Singles - main draw